WTTR (1470 AM) is a full service and classic hits broadcast radio station licensed to Westminster, Maryland, serving Carroll County, Maryland.  WTTR is owned and operated by Hilltop Communications, LLC.

History 
WTTR was placed on the air in 1953 by local businessman Russ Morgan, the first song broadcast was the Star Spangled Banner on the 4th of July. In the 1960s. Carroll County Broadcasting Company retained ownership of WTTR AM and FM until the station was sold to Shamrock Broadcasting in the early 1980s.
In 1981 WTTR AM changed format to Adult Contemporary, operating as a daytime only station known as Carroll Community Radio. The station had a full time news team and 3 full time DJs. In 1984, Shamrock was granted permission by the FCC to allow WTTR AM to broadcast at night, adding two additional towers at its Uniontown Road studios in Westminster. The station broadcast a successful MOR format dubbed Nightime Nastalgia hosted by DJ Steve Spencer and played Big Band Standards from the 40s and 50s.
At the same time, WTTR FM switched its long time association with the Baltimore Orioles to WTTR AM and continues their relationship with the team today.

Well known DJ Dwight Dingle, a retired school teacher joined WTTR part time in 1974 and later became Operations Manager and then General Manager in 1986 until his death in November, 2009. He was tightly involved with the community serving on the Carroll County Chamber of Commerce.

WTTR AM is also known for its local sports content broadcasting weekly high school football and basketball games as well as Western Maryland College games and Babe Ruth Baseball play by play. Dwight Dingle and Charlie Beckhardt provided the play by play. The duo also created the Carroll County High School Athlete of the Week award,honoring local athletic accomplishments.

Shamrock moved the FM to Baltimore in 1984 and constructed a new tower in Hampstead to increase its signal to Baltimore. The station changed its call letters to WGRX and debuted a Eclectic Rock format for several years. After trying a number of formats from Country to Heavy Metal, the station  eventually settled on its present Classic Rock format under the call letters WZBA.
 
Shamrock sold WTTR to Sajak Broadcasting Corporation in 2005. In late September, 2013, Sajak Broadcasting announced an agreement to sell WTTR to the newly formed Hilltop Communications, LLC. Hilltop assumed ownership on 12/19/2013.

On January 1, 2014, WTTR shifted their format from oldies to classic hits of the 60's, 70's, and 80's.

On July 18, 2016, WTTR went live with their 102.3 FM translator frequency.

External links
1470 WTTR Online

TTR
1953 establishments in Maryland
Radio stations established in 1953
Westminster, Maryland